Mortimer's disease is a skin disease characterized by red blotchy patterns appearing all over the face and hands, and spreading through the body in an almost symmetrical pattern. The fact that there are no ulcers, and an absence of crust, indicate that this is a different entity than lupus vulgaris. The disease was originally documented by Jonathan Hutchinson (1828-1913), and became an eponym after his patient, Mrs. Mortimer.

References 
http://www.whonamedit.com/synd.cfm/845.html
http://www.whonamedit.com/doctor.cfm/890.html

Ailments of unknown cause
Immune system disorders